The Parliament of Great Britain was formed in May 1707 following the ratification of the Acts of Union by both the Parliament of England and the Parliament of Scotland.  The Acts ratified the treaty of Union which created a new unified Kingdom of Great Britain and created the parliament of Great Britain located in the former home of the English parliament in the Palace of Westminster, near the City of London. This lasted nearly a century, until the Acts of Union 1800 merged the separate British and Irish Parliaments into a single Parliament of the United Kingdom with effect from 1 January 1801.

History
Following the Treaty of Union in 1706, Acts of Union ratifying the Treaty were passed in both the Parliament of England and the Parliament of Scotland, which created a new Kingdom of Great Britain. The Acts paved the way for the enactment of the treaty of Union which created a new parliament, referred to as the 'Parliament of Great Britain', based in the home of the former English parliament. All of the traditions, procedures, and standing orders of the English parliament were retained, although there is no provision for this within the treaty, and to this day this is a contentious issue, as were the incumbent officers, and members representing England comprised the overwhelming majority of the new body. It was not even considered necessary to hold a new general election. While Scots law and Scottish legislation remained separate, new legislation was thereafter to be enacted by the new parliament, with the exception of that pertaining to private right which could only legislated on for the “evident utility” of the people.

After the Hanoverian King George I ascended the British throne in 1714 through the Act of Settlement of 1701, real power continued to shift away from the monarchy. George was a German ruler, spoke poor English, and remained interested in governing his dominions in continental Europe rather than in Britain. He thus entrusted power to a group of his ministers, the foremost of whom was Sir Robert Walpole, and by the end of his reign in 1727 the position of the ministers – who had to rely on Parliament for support – was cemented. George I's successor, his son George II, continued to follow through with his father's domestic policies and made little effort to re-establish monarchical control over the government which was now in firm control by Parliament. By the end of the 18th century the monarch still had considerable influence over Parliament, which was dominated by the English aristocracy, by means of patronage, but had ceased to exert direct power: for instance, the last occasion on which royal assent was withheld was in 1708 by Queen Anne. At general elections the vote was restricted to freeholders and landowners, in constituencies that had changed little since the Middle Ages, so that in many "rotten" and "pocket" boroughs seats could be bought, while major cities remained unrepresented, except by the Knights of the Shire representing whole counties. Reformers and Radicals sought parliamentary reform, but as the French Revolutionary Wars developed the British government became repressive against dissent and progress towards reform was stalled.

George II's successor, George III, sought to restore royal supremacy and absolute monarchy, but by the end of his reign the position of the king's ministers – who discovered that they needed the support of Parliament to enact any major changes – had become central to the role of British governance, and would remain so ever after.

During the first half of George III's reign, the monarch still had considerable influence over Parliament, which itself was dominated by the patronage and influence of the English nobility. Most candidates for the House of Commons were identified as Whigs or Tories, but once elected they formed shifting coalitions of interests rather than dividing along clear party lines. At general elections the vote was restricted in most places to property owners, in constituencies which were out of date and did not reflect the growing importance of manufacturing towns or shifts of population, so that in the rotten and pocket boroughs seats in parliament could be bought from the rich landowners who controlled them, while major cities remained unrepresented. Reformers like William Beckford and Radicals beginning with John Wilkes called for reform of the system. In 1780, a draft programme of reform was drawn up by Charles James Fox and Thomas Brand Hollis and put forward by a sub-committee of the electors of Westminster. This included calls for the six points later adopted by the Chartists.

The American War of Independence ended in defeat for a foreign policy that sought to prevent the thirteen American colonies from breaking away and forming their own independent nation, something which George III had fervently advocated, and in March 1782 the king was forced to appoint an administration led by his opponents which sought to curb royal patronage. In November of 1783, he took the opportunity to use his influence in the House of Lords to defeat a bill to reform the Honourable East India Company, dismissed the government of the day, and appointed William Pitt the Younger to form a new government. Pitt had previously called for Parliament to begin to reform itself, but he did not press for long for reforms the king did not like. Proposals Pitt made in April 1785 to redistribute seats from the "rotten boroughs" to London and the counties were defeated in the House of Commons by 248 votes to 174.

In the wake of the French Revolution of 1789, Radical organisations such as the London Corresponding Society sprang up to press for parliamentary reform, but as the French Revolutionary Wars developed the government took extensive repressive measures against feared domestic unrest aping the democratic and egalitarian ideals of the French Revolution and progress toward reform was stalled for decades.

Parliament of the United Kingdom 
In 1801, the Parliament of the United Kingdom was created when the Kingdom of Great Britain was united with the Kingdom of Ireland to become the United Kingdom of Great Britain and Ireland under the Acts of Union 1800.

See also
 List of Acts of the Parliament of Great Britain
 List of parliaments of Great Britain
 First Parliament of Great Britain
 List of speakers of the British House of Commons
 Parliament of Ireland
 Members of the Parliament of Great Britain

References

External links

Connected Histories

 
1707 establishments in Great Britain
1801 disestablishments in the United Kingdom
Great Britain
Politics of the Kingdom of Great Britain
Great Britain